Robin Schiff is a Hollywood writer-producer, best known for the movie Romy and Michele's High School Reunion starring Lisa Kudrow and Mira Sorvino. Schiff was a member of the comedy troupe The Groundlings. She does an interview series once a year for the Writers Guild Foundation called Anatomy Of A Script, where she and Winnie Holzman (writer of the musical Wicked and creator of My So Called Life) discuss the craft with other well-known writers. Schiff also teaches a writing class with Wendy Goldman (whom she met at The Groundlings) called Improv For Writing.

Career

Film work
Schiff was the Executive Producer and Screenwriter of Romy and Michele's High School Reunion in 1997.  She also wrote Loverboy.

Television work
Schiff was recently a consulting producer on Emily In Paris in 2020 and in 2021 she was a co-executive producer on the show.  She is currently a consulting producer on Darren Star's new show UnCoupled starring Neil Patrick Harris.  She was executive producer of the YouTube Red series Sideswiped in 2018. Schiff began her TV career as the story editor for Rags to Riches, NBC, 1987–88. She was the supervising producer for Working Girl, NBC, 1990. She was the creator and supervising producer for Princesses, CBS, 1991. She was the supervising producer and creative consultant for Delta, CBS, 1992–93. She was the consulting producer for Party of Five, Fox, 1994–2000. She was the creator and executive producer for Almost Perfect, CBS, 1995–96. She was the consulting producer for Thanks, CBS, 1999. She was the executive producer for Grosse Pointe, The WB, 2000–2001. She was the consulting producer for Coupling, NBC, 2003 and for Miss Match, NBC, 2003.   The rest of her credits are available on IMDb.

Screenplays
Schiff wrote the screenplays for Loverboy (Tristar, 1989) and Romy and Michele's High School Reunion (Buena Vista, 1997).

References

External links

Living people
American women screenwriters
American women television writers
Place of birth missing (living people)
Year of birth missing (living people)
American women film producers
American television writers
21st-century American women